Michael Edward Platt (born 12 December 1968) is a British billionaire hedge fund manager. He is the co-founder and managing director of BlueCrest Capital Management, Europe's third-largest hedge-fund firm which he co-founded in 2000.

He is Britain's wealthiest hedge fund manager according to the Forbes Real Time Billionaires List, with an estimated wealth of US$15.2 billion.

Early life and education
Platt was born in Preston, Lancashire, England in 1968. His father taught civil engineering at the University of Manchester. His mother was a university administrator. His grandmother, whom he has described as "a serious equity trader," introduced him to investment. She "helped him buy stock in trust savings banks that were selling shares to the public." At 14, he invested £500 in a shipping line, Common Brothers, that soon tripled in price. Some of his first investments were in Britain's newly privatised utilities.

He studied civil engineering at Imperial College London, but after a year, switched to mathematics and economics at the London School of Economics, from which he graduated in 1991.

Investment career

Early career
Platt started in the  after his grandmother gave him some shares in which to invest and he discovered he had a talent for investing.

He joined JP Morgan in 1991. Platt assumed responsibility for developing JP Morgan's swaps and options trading business in April 1992, and in April 1996, became the head of trading for all swaps products relating to the 11 founding states of the European single currency, the euro. In 2000 Platt co-founded BlueCrest Capital Management LLP, with William Reeves.

BlueCrest Capital

Discerning in August 2007 that "a stock market crash lay ahead," Platt "sold his bank shares, and bought ‘safe’ sovereign bonds," and thus "avoided the worst of the financial crisis, and profited from the resulting 'flight to quality' and plunge in interest rates."

As of 2014, BlueCrest was Europe's fourth largest hedge fund. In that year, it managed over £30 billion and employed 350 people. BlueCrest initially focused on trading interest rates and using computer algorithms to capture trends in bonds and commodities. In 2013 it expanded into trading equity to compete with Millennium Management LLC and SAC Capital Advisors LLP.

In 2011, George Soros decided to stop managing money for outside clients and turn his hedge-fund firm into a family office. Soros spoke to Platt, asking him to take on more than $1 billion for a 0.5 percent management fee and a 10 percent performance fee. Platt reportedly declined the offer, saying plenty of investors were willing to pay BlueCrest 2-and-20, the industry standard fee structure.

That same year, Platt discussed the crisis in the Eurozone, attributing it to "the cultural and political divide" between north and south. "The reality is that there is no willingness within the Eurozone to share wealth," he said. "In the United States, if California is having a really difficult time, the rest of the United States will send money to California. This is not the case in Europe." He further maintained that Europe's problem was that "almost every part of it has gone wrong now. The banks are undercapitalized…If banks were hedge funds, and you mark them to market properly, I would say that probably most of them are insolvent." By contrast, he was relatively positive about the U.S. and Germany.

In 2013, BlueCrest invested $50 million in Meredith Whitney's hedge fund, Kenbelle Capital.  In October of that year, BlueCrest made a redemption request, but while Kenbelle said it would comply, no repayment was forthcoming. The next year, BlueCrest sued in Bermuda to get its money back from the firm.  In 2015, Whitney closed up shop and paid back all her investors, including BlueCrest.

In December 2015, Platt announced that BlueCrest would return $7 billion for outside investors, take no outside money in the future, and become a private partnership. In his letter to investors explaining the change, Platt explained that "Recent developments in the industry, including, among other things, downward pressure on fee levels, the increasing cost of hiring the best portfolio management talent and the difficulty in tailoring investment products to meet the individual needs and constraints of a large number of diverse investors, have all significantly reduced industry profitability and flexibility." Consequently "BlueCrest believes that a transition to a Private Investment Partnership model is now appropriate for the business."
 
In 2016, BlueCrest had a profit of almost 50 percent; in 2017, Platt "led his private investment firm to a 54 percent gain." This contrasted with "mediocre returns at some of the largest hedge funds in the world," noted Bloomberg News. In 2018, the Sunday Times named Platt "the richest hedge fund manager in the City." During the year, his net wealth had grown by 25 percent. In March 2019, he was named one of the highest-earning hedge fund managers and traders by Forbes. In 2019 BlueCrest's trading operation returned 53.5% net after expenses and made Platt approximately $2 billion. BlueCrest posted a 95 percent gain in 2020, it swelled Platt's net worth to $10 billion. In 2021, the Sunday Times Rich List estimated his net worth at £8 billion.

Strategy 

In July 2017, Platt's investment strategy was described as follows: "Platt splits BlueCrest's assets between systematic strategies (based on pattern-spotting computer algorithms) and discretionary (human-driven) trades. The systematic trades are generally trend-following strategies – basically, buying assets that are going up, and selling ones that are falling. He delegates the day-to-day management to his traders, but retains overall control. He believes in aggressive stop losses – he will cut traders’ allocations drastically if they lose as little as 3% of their capital, but will also lift allocations to winning trades."

In his first live television interview, given to Bloomberg on 15 December 2011, Platt said that there are "three things he won't touch – exposure to banks, peripheral debt risk, and illiquid investments."

Asked how he finds "talented traders" to employ, he has said that he seeks out "someone who understands an edge." For example, "I look for the type of guy in London who gets up at seven o’clock on Sunday morning when his kids are still in bed and logs on to a poker site so that he can pick off the US drunks coming home on Saturday night."  There are at least three other things he looks for in traders: first, "[a]n understanding that the market is always right," so that in when the market  is stress, value is irrelevant; second, "[p]aranoia," which can lead them "to hedge their winning trades" and help them to "manage when they have losing positions"; third, an ability to admit when one is wrong.

Personal life
In 2010, he moved from London to Geneva, Switzerland to avoid increased regulation and for "better staffing options". In 2014, it was reported that he had relocated to Jersey, along with his hedge fund, which was moving from nearby Guernsey, for tax purposes.

He is a notable art collector having built a contemporary art collection not by shopping for pictures, but by commissioning them from well-known artists. He has a private showroom in the crypt of a deconsecrated church at One Marylebone, which displays a selection of art by, among others, taxidermist Polly Morgan, the Turner Prize-winning sculptor and installation artist Keith Tyson and Reece Jones "an artist who works mainly in charcoal".

Platt appeared as himself on Showtime's series Billions in episode 1, Season 3.

In December 2019 Platt was ridiculed by CNBC after a video went viral in which Platt told a taxi driver that he was the highest earning person in finance.

References

1968 births
Alumni of the London School of Economics
English art collectors
English billionaires
English expatriates in Switzerland
British hedge fund managers
English financial businesspeople
English investors
English stock traders
Living people
Businesspeople from Preston, Lancashire
Stock and commodity market managers
Conservative Party (UK) donors